Lotokila Sugar Refinery (LSR), also Lotokila Sugar Complex (French: Complexe Sucrier de Lotokila), was a sugar manufacturer in the Congo. The sugar complex comprised a sugar plantation, a sugar mill and a distillery. The industrial complex was established in 1973, as a public private partnership between Tshopo Province Administration, and an undisclosed private Chinese company. The complex closed down permanently in 2010.

Location
The geographical coordinates of Lotokila are: 0°42'47.0"N, 24°33'23.0"E (Latitude:0.713056; Longitude:24.556389).

Overview
At its heyday, the company was a large sugar manufacturer, with a large plantation, occupying thousands of acres. It employed over 3,000 full-time and part-time workers. In addition to sugar, the complex distilled ethanol for industrial use and human consumption.

In 1993, the Chinese investors pulled out of the partnership and the joint venture. They exited the Democratic Republic of the Congo, on account of a deteriorating security environment and declining financial conditions. The provincial administration in Kisangani tried unsuccessfully to soldier on by themselves, closing the sugar mill, cutting down staff numbers by 90 percent to 300, but maintaining the cane fields. They too threw in the towel and closed the industrial complex for good in 2010.

Ownership
LSR was a joint venture between Tshopo Provincial Administration and an undisclosed Chinese company.

Other considerations
With the liquidation of the refinery, local law requires the shareholders to pay terminal benefits to the employees on the pay roster at the time of closure, taking into account (a) seniority and (b) duration of service.

The Tshopo Provincial Administration attempted to settle some of those claims but ran out of money. Almost 900 former workers who are not satisfied, organized a daily sit-down protest in a public park in the city of Kisangani, which has gone on daily since 2013.

See also
 Economy of the Democratic Republic of the Congo
 List of sugar manufacturers in the Democratic Republic of the Congo

References

External links
 Reference to the Remains of Lotokila Sugar Refinery

Food and drink companies established in 1973
Tshopo
Sugar companies of the Democratic Republic of the Congo
Agriculture in the Democratic Republic of the Congo
Agriculture companies established in 1973